Castle Hill is a suburb of Sydney, New South Wales, Australia, located 34 kilometres north-west of the Sydney central business district and 9.5 kilometres north of Parramatta. It is within the Hills District region, split between the local government areas of The Hills Shire and Hornsby Shire.

History

Indigenous history 
The land that is now called Castle Hill was originally home to the Bidjigal people, who are believed to be a clan of the Dharuk people, who occupied all the land to the immediate west of Sydney. The best-known Aboriginal person from that time is Pemulwuy, a Bidjigal leader who led the resistance movement against settlers during the Hawkesbury and Nepean Wars, including sacking farms in Castle Hill, before his eventual capture and dispatch by local law enforcement.

The Bidjigal people are today commemorated by Bidjigal Reserve which straddles the suburbs of Castle Hill, North Rocks and West Pennant Hills.

European settlement
The first European visitors to the district were led by Governor Phillip in April 1791 accompanied by an entourage. Travelling from Parramatta reaching the 'hills' following the Aboriginal trails, which today are overlaid by the Windsor and Old Northern Roads. As Governor he needed to find new country for settlement and farming land for crops so as to feed a struggling infant colony.

Governor King began Third Government Farm there on 8 July 1801, referring to it as "Castle Hill" on 1 March 1802. The majority of the convicts who worked the prison farm were Irish Catholics, many having been transported for seditious activity in 1798. They were branded "politicals" and exiled for life, never to return.

The first free settler in Castle Hill, a Frenchman Baron Verincourt de Clambe, in unusual circumstances received a grant of 200 acres (81 ha) in 1802. It has been suggested that locals of the time commonly referred to de Clambe's house ("The Hermitage") as "The Castle" because of the Baron's noble status.

On Sunday night 4 March 1804, the convicts rose up as one in what was to become known as the Castle Hill convict rebellion, also known as the Second Battle of Vinegar Hill.

In later years the area became filled with market gardens and orchards which supplied Sydney. As Sydney expanded, the orchards disappeared and were replaced with a sprawl of suburban dwellings, retail and commercial establishments and light industry. The Hills Shire Council commemorates the shire's former role as an orange-growing area with the Orange Blossom Festival each year.

Castle Hill Post Office opened on 1 January 1869.

20th century
In the past Castle Hill was serviced by the Rogans Hill railway line to Parramatta to take the rural area's produce to the city. However, it was closed in 1932, due to competition with buses, trucks and cars.

Local landmarks include:
 Castle Hill House (circa 1844) on Old Northern Road, which has a local-government heritage listing;
 The public school (1879), Old Northern Road, also with a LG heritage listing;
 The former parsonage (1866), Parsonage Road; 
 The former church, Old Northern Road, now converted to commercial use.

A notable part of Castle Hill's cultural history was the period from the post-war period until 1968 in which Nobel laureate Patrick White and his partner Manoly Lascaris lived at 74 Showground Road in a house they named "Dogwoods". For much of that period, they worked several hectares of farmland at the site. White wrote several of his most well-known novels while at Castle Hill; the suburb formed the basis of fictional settings for the novels The Tree of Man, The Solid Mandala, Riders in the Chariot, the collection of short stories The Burnt Ones, and the play The Season at Sarsaparilla. In his work, Castle Hill went variously by the names of "Sarsaparilla" and Durilgai". White based several characters on his experience of local individuals in Castle Hill at the time.

Heritage listings 
Castle Hill has a number of heritage-listed sites, including:
 Gilbert Road: Third Government Farm
 221 Old Northern Road: St Paul's Anglican Church, Castle Hill (former)

Demographics

Summary

Population & Culture 
According to the 2016 census, there were 39,594 residents in Castle Hill. 57.8% of people were born in Australia. The most common countries of birth were China 6.8%, England 3.8%, India 3.1%, South Korea 2.3% and South Africa 1.8%. In Castle Hill 61.2% of people only spoke English at home. Other languages spoken at home included Mandarin 8.3%, Cantonese 4.2%, Korean 3.0%, Arabic 1.7% and Persian 1.6%. The most common responses for religion in Castle Hill were Catholic 26.8%, No Religion 23.5% and Anglican 14.6%.

Wealth 
Castle Hill residents have a personal income that is 18.9% greater than the median national income. In March 2019, Castle Hill had a median house sale price of A$1.4 million. Suburbs north of Castle Hill have a generally higher sale price (Kenthurst, A$2.4 million; Glenhaven, A$1.5 million). Suburbs south of Castle Hill generally have a significantly lower house sale price (Baulkham Hills, A$1.1 million; Blacktown, A$683,750).

Commercial areas 

Castle Hill's commercial area centres on a section of the Old Northern Road at the suburb's eastern side. Its southern side is an older, traditional shopping strip, with the modest-sized Castle Mall shopping centre. Its northern side is dominated by the large Castle Towers shopping centre, with two department stores as well as two Event cinema multiplexes (giving a total of 16 Cinemas). A new library and community centre, with a unit apartment building on its upper floors, opened next to Castle Towers in 2004.

Work has finished by the local council to convert the stretch of Old Northern Road between Castle Mall and Castle Towers, into a plaza walk way. The main traffic road has been diverted through the nearby, Terminus Street. A$900 million plan to add 80,000 square metres to the Castle Towers Shopping Centre has been approved, which will result in Castle Towers becoming the largest shopping centre in New South Wales, with a total of 190,000 square metres of active floorspace. 

Castle Hill also has a light industrial area at the suburb's western side. It is linked with the commercial area by Showground Road. The Castle Hill Showground and location of the former Hills Shire Council Chambers and Hills Centre are adjacent to this area.

Residential areas 

Castle Hill is a mix of low- to medium-density housing, with exception to a few apartment complexes. In 2005 year under the NSW Housing Strategy Hume Avenue was rezoned to medium density, to allow for low rise unit, and town house developments.

The largest residential area in Castle Hill is located at the two sides of Showground Road, sandwiched between the commercial and the industrial area. Smaller residential areas are located at the east of the commercial area, as well as the suburb's north-east (part of Hornsby Shire, separated by Old Northern Road and Castle Hill Road). These consist almost entirely of free-standing houses. Several government and private schools, as well as an RSL Club, are located within these areas. To the North of Showground Road lies suburban, with approximately 1000 homes, the Samuel Gilbert Public School, Castle Glen Oval and the Knightsbridge Shopping Court. South of Showground Road, and to the east of Old Northern Road, lies the East Excelsior section of the suburb, known for its leafy streets, mature gardens and established homes on large land parcels, which is adjacent to Bidjigal Reserve. Managed by a community Trust, Bidjigal Reserve is about 186ha of bushland located within the Sydney suburbs of Castle Hill, West Pennant Hills, Beecroft, Cherrybrook, North Rocks and Baulkham Hills. There are many walking trails, and three marked tracks: Platypus loops along creeks from the entrance at Excelsior Ave; Burraga follows creeks and climbs Bald Hill from Platypus track, and the Murri Yanna begins at Aiken Road or Heidi Place and follows Darling Mills Creek to North Parramatta.

Transport 
The bulk of Castle Hill residents own private vehicles and travel to work using these, however bus services and the Sydney Metro Northwest run to the suburb.

Bus Services
Castle Hill is well served by private buses operated by Hillsbus which provides express services to Sydney CBD, as well as Parramatta, Pennant Hills, West Pennant Hills, Beecroft, Dural, Hornsby, Macquarie Park, Baulkham Hills, Rouse Hill, Cherrybrook and Busways, which provides services to Stanhope Gardens, Kellyville, Glenwood, Bella Vista and Blacktown. Castle Hill is served by the following services:

Hillsbus

 600 – Hornsby to Parramatta via Pennant Hills, Cherrybrook and Baulkham Hills
 603 – Rouse Hill Town Centre to Parramatta via Kellyville, Glenhaven and Baulkham Hills
 604 – Dural to Parramatta via Hills Showground, Jasper Road and Churchill Drive
 610X – Castle Hill to Queen Victoria Building via M2
 612X – Castle Hill to North Sydney via M2 (peak hours only)
 619 – Castle Hill to Macquarie Park (peak hours only)
 632 – Rouse Hill to Pennant Hills via Norwest, Tuckwell Road, Anglican Retirement Village and Cherrybrook Station
 633 – Rouse Hill to Pennant Hills via Beaumont Hills, Kellyville, Hills Showground and Cherrybrook Station
 635 – Castle Hill to Beecroft via Anglican Retirement Village, Cherrybrook Village, Cherrybrook Station and West Pennant Hills
 637 – Castle Hill to Glenorie
 638 – Castle Hill to Berrilee
 639 – Castle Hill to Kenthurst
 651 – Rouse Hill to Epping via T-Way, Kellyville, Hills Showground, West Pennant Hills and Beecroft
 660 – Castle Hill (Castlewood Estate) to Parramatta via Hills Showground, Crestwood and Winston Hills
 662 – Castle Hill to Parramatta via Tuckwell Road and Norwest

Busways
 730 – Castle Hill to Blacktown

Rail services
Castle Hill is served by the Castle Hill and Hills Showground stations of the Metro North West Line, which opened on 26 May 2019, connecting  to  via .

Major works were undertaken in 1922 to convert the line into a railway, and trains began servicing Castle Hill on 28 January 1923. In 1924, the railway line was extended beyond its existing termnius to Rogans Hill. As a cost-cutting measure, the state Labor government of Jack Lang closed the line on 31 January 1932, amid much public protest.

Several proposals existed for another rail line to Castle Hill, resulting in the Sydney Metro Northwest beginning construction on 18 June 2014.

Education 
 Gilroy Catholic College – Private Catholic College
 William Clarke College – Private Anglican School, K-12
 Oakhill College – Private Catholic College
 St. Bernadette's – Catholic Co-Educational Primary School
 Castle Hill High School – Public High School
 Castle Hill Public School – Public Primary School
 Excelsior Public – Public Primary School
 Samuel Gilbert Public School – Public Primary School
 St. Angela's – Catholic Co-Educational Primary School
 Oakhill Drive Public School – Public Primary School
 Castle Hill House – Vocational Centre run by Redeemer Baptist Church
 Hills Adventist College – Private Seventh Day Adventist K-12 School

Cultural activities
The Hills Centre for the Performing Arts was a theatre and convention venue located on Showground Road, Castle Hill. Opened in late 1988 and under the ownership of The Hills Shire Council it was one of the largest venues of this type in New South Wales until it was demolished in 2013 to make way for the Sydney Metro Northwest.

Castle Hill Players put on six plays a year at the Pavilion Theatre in the grounds of the Castle Hill Showground. They have entertained at the Pavilion Theatre since 1966.

Castle Hill is home to storage for the Powerhouse Museum.  The Museums Discovery Centre (MDC) is a collaboration between the Museum of Applied Arts and Sciences (MAAS), Australian Museum (AM) and Sydney Living Museums (SLM). The Museums Discovery Centre is an off-site visible storage and collection care facility, located on the corner of Windsor and Showground roads in Castle Hill. It has a unique and diverse collection of 400,000 objects spanning history, science, technology, design, industry, decorative arts, music, transport and space exploration. The MDC houses 40 per cent of the collection (by volume), or about 50,000 objects and is now open to the general public.

Access programs include themed supervised tours into stores on site; educational programs and workshops, tours for school groups and special-interest groups; school holiday programs; community engagement programs; regional partnership events; and specialist/industry and professional development programs. These provide insight not only to MAAS , AM and SLM Collections but to the important preservation undertaken there.

The Hills Craft Markets are open the fourth Sunday of each month, except January. A variety of arts and crafts and foods are offered for sale. Children can enjoy plaster painting, music, riding and playing in the showground.

In late March the annual Castle Hill Agricultural Show is held at the Castle Hill Showground. This show dates back to the 1880s and reflects the heritage of the Hills District. The show is mainly agricultural with many sheep, cattle and horse competitions on every year. The Castle Hill show also includes novelty games and items, showbags and educational stalls. The show runs for three days over the weekend (Friday, Saturday, and Sunday).

Lifestyle
In 2008, The Hills Shire (formerly known as Baulkham Hills, New South Wales) ranked 4th amongst all LGAs in Sydney and 12th amongst the 590 LGAs nationally in terms of Quality of Life.

Notable residents 

Notable current and former residents of the suburb include:
 Patrick White - Deceased Nobel Prize-winning novelist, playwright, poet, short-story writer, essayist. Lived in Castle Hill for eighteen years after World War II.
 Ray Warren – sports commentator, nicknamed "Rabbits" or "Rabbs".
 Christina Parie – 6th place on The X Factor Australia season 3.
 Georgia Garnett –  AFL Women's player

Gallery

References

External links

  

 
Suburbs of Sydney
Populated places established in 1802
1802 establishments in Australia